Hockey Club Bolzano Foxes, also known as commercial name HCB Alto Adige Alperia (in Italian) or HCB Südtirol Alperia (in German) is an Italian ice hockey team located in the city of Bolzano, South Tyrol autonomous province, that plays in the Austrian Hockey League (EBEL). It remains the most successful team in the history of the Italian Serie A, with 19 championships.

History
HC Bolzano was founded in 1933 and in the first twenty years of its existence, home games were played in an outdoor rink until 1953, when the club moved into the Bolzano Exhibition Hall, which was the first artificial ice was available. Eleven of the nineteen Italian league titles were won there before the team moved in 1994, to the newly built Palaonda/Eiswelle. At the same time, the team also participated in the Alps League in part, an international ice hockey competition, attended by teams from Slovenia and Austria were involved. In addition to a master and three runner-up titles in this competition, the team also won another seven Italian titles, the last of which in 2012 was given the three-time winning the Coppa Italia, the Italian League Cup competition. Other achievements include three gains of the Supercoppa Italiana and the Six Nations tournament, also called Caucasian Ligacup, in 1994.

In 2013, the HC Bolzano applied again for inclusion in the Erste Bank Eishockey Liga (EBEL), after earlier applications failed each time due to the resistance of the Italian Ice Hockey Federation. However, the chaotic conditions in the Serie A paved the way to acceptance, since a large part of the club that was from the second division had been released. The move was also largely motivated by the need of a new major sponsor to help clear their financial situation.

Known as the HCB Südtirol in the EBEL (the main sponsor is the tourism promotion agency of the Alto Adige – Südtirol region), Bolzano had surprisingly successful inaugural season in 2013–14. On the back of a heavy recruitment scheme which centred in signing Canadian players of Italian heritage, Bolzano finished in fourth place by the end of the Regulation season. In the EBEL finals, they went on to win the championship by defeating the EC Red Bull Salzburg in the finals, and in doing so becoming to first non-Austrian based club to win the Austrian Championship.

With the victory of the EBEL championship, Bolzano ensured qualification to the first edition of the Champions Hockey League, a prestigious tournament for European clubs. Despite their status of EBEL defending Champions, Bolzano due to numerous financial difficulties that risked compromising the entry of the team in these competitions, were late in confirming their status for a second EBEL season.

In May 2016 it was announced that the South Tyrol energy producer Alperia would become the main sponsor of the team.

In 2018 the HC Bozen Alperia defeat the EC Red Bull Salzburg in game-7 of the final to win the EBEL championship for a second time. After the successful final, historic captain Alexander Egger announced his retirement from professional ice hockey.

Honours
Austrian Hockey League
Winners (2): 2013–14, 2017–18
Serie A
Winners (19): 1962–63, 1972–73, 1976–77, 1977–78, 1978–79, 1981–82, 1982–83, 1983–84, 1984–85, 1987–88, 1989–90, 1994–95, 1995–96, 1996–97, 1997–98, 1999–00, 2007–08, 2008–09, 2011–12
Coppa Italia
Winners (3): 2004, 2007, 2009
Supercoppa Italiana
Winners (4): 2004, 2007, 2008, 2012
Alpenliga
Winners (1): 1994
Six Nations Tournament:
Winners (1): 1994
Coppa delle Alpi:
Winners (1): 1963

Players

Current roster

Updated 4 February, 2023.

 

|}

Notable alumni

  Roger Åkerström
  Glenn Anderson
  Alexander Andrijevski
  Dave Baseggio
  Scott Beattie
  Oleg Belov
  James Black
  Jim Boni
  Robin Bouchard
  Steve Bozek
  Markus Brunner
  Jim Camazzola
  Dan Currie
  Matt DeMarchi
  Doug Derraugh
  Nate DiCasmirro
  Flavio Faggioni
  Mario Doyon
  Mark Dutiaume
  Daniel Fernholm
  Ron Flockhart
  Martin Gendron
  Phil Groeneveld
  Chris Hajt
  Jari Helle (coach)
  Rudi Hiti
  Niklas Hjalmarsson
  Viktors Ignatjevs
  Tony Iob
  Kim Issel
  Lars Ivarsson
  Jaromír Jágr
  Regan Kelly
  Jordan Krestanovich
  Brian Loney
  Jamie Lundmark
  Bob Manno
  Daniel Marois
  Shayne McCosh
  Paul Messier
  Robert Mulick
  Jason Muzzatti
  Mark Napier
  Sergei Naumov
  Jeff Nelson
  Jan Němeček
  Kent Nilsson
  Robert Oberrauch
  Josh Olson
  Gates Orlando
  Grigorijs Panteļejevs
  Dave Pasin
  Gino Pasqualotto
  Martin Pavlu
  Mario Nobili
  Michel Petit
  Neil Petruic
  Frank Pietrangelo
  Ray Podloski
  Deron Quint
  Mike Rosati
  Adam Russo
  Peter Schaefer
  Jeff Sebastian
  Patrice Tardif
  Lucio Topatigh
  Sylvain Turgeon
  Perry Turnbull
  Tony Tuzzolino
  Ramil Yuldashev
  Rob Zamuner
  Bruno Zarrillo

References

External links
  

Ice hockey teams in Italy
Austrian Hockey League teams
Alpenliga teams
HC Bozen–Bolzano
Ice hockey clubs established in 1933
1933 establishments in Italy